The DG Flugzeugbau DG-800 series is a family of 15 metre and 18 metre single-seat gliders and motor gliders produced by Glaser-Dirks since 1993 and by DG Flugzeugbau GmbH after 1997. It is the successor to the DG-400 and the DG-600 models.

Design and development
The DG-800 was planned primarily as a powered self-launching sailplane. In the meantime it has spawned many variants, differentiated by the type of powerplant (Rotax, Midwest or Solo), the span extensions (15 metre, 18 metre, both in variants with or without winglets), maximum allowed take-off mass, etc.

The newest model is the DG-808C, a self launching sailplane with a Solo 2625 engine and the new designed "DEI-NT" Engine Control System.

There are also unpowered variants, the DG-800S and DG-808S, aimed at competition flying. These pure glider variants have a shorter and lighter fuselage built in the moulds of the DG-600 and allow a broader range of wing loadings.

Specifications (Competition DG-808C with 18-metre wings)

See also

References

DG-Flugzeugbau website
Specification of DG-808C
Reports about the DG-808 family

1990s German sailplanes
Motor gliders
DG-0800
T-tail aircraft
Mid-wing aircraft
Single-engined tractor aircraft
Aircraft first flown in 1993